Vanuralite is a mineral of uranium with chemical formula: Al(UO2)2(VO4)2(OH)·11(H2O). It has yellow crystals and  a Mohs hardness of 2. The name comes from the composition of the mineral.

References

Mindat.org
Webmineral data

Uranium(VI) minerals
Vanadate minerals
Monoclinic minerals